Herilla is a genus of gastropods belonging to the family Clausiliidae.

The species of this genus are found in the Balkans.

Species:

Herilla bosniensis 
Herilla durmitoris 
Herilla illyrica 
Herilla jabucica 
Herilla pavlovici 
Herilla ziegleri

References

Clausiliidae